Charlie's Angels: Original Motion Picture Soundtrack is the soundtrack to the film Charlie's Angels, based on the television series of the same name created by Ivan Goff and Ben Roberts. It was released through Republic Records on November 1, 2019, and was executive produced by Ariana Grande and Savan Kotecha. The lead single, "Don't Call Me Angel", by Grande, Miley Cyrus and Lana Del Rey, was released on September 13. The soundtrack's second single, "How It's Done", by Kash Doll, Kim Petras, Alma and Stefflon Don, was released on October 11 with the album's pre-order. The soundtrack also features contributions from Normani, Nicki Minaj, Anitta, Chaka Khan, Victoria Monét, and Tayla Parx.

Track listing
Credits adapted from Apple Music, Spotify, and Tidal.

Notes
  signifies a co-producer
  signifies a vocal producer
  signifies a remixer
  signifies an additional producer

Personnel
Credits adapted from AllMusic.

Performers and vocals

 Kash Doll – vocals 
 Kim Petras – vocals 
 Alma – vocals 
 Stefflon Don – vocals 
 Ariana Grande – vocals 
 Nicki Minaj – vocals 
 Normani – vocals 
 Miley Cyrus – vocals 
 Lana Del Rey – vocals 
 M-22 – vocals 
 Arlissa – vocals 
 Kiana Ledé – vocals 
 Donna Summer – vocals 
 Chaka Khan – vocals 
 Anitta – vocals 
 Danielle Bradbery – vocals, background vocals 
 Victoria Monét – vocals 
 Rami Yacoub - background vocals 
 ILYA - background vocals 
 Savan Kotecha - background vocals 
 Matthew Humphrey - background vocals 
 Frank Sanders - background vocals 
 Max Martin - background vocals 
 Lourdiz - background vocals 
 Madeleine van der Veer - background vocals 
 Nikki Williams - background vocals 
 Jordan "DJ Swivel" Young - background vocals

Instrumentation

 Rami Yacoub - keys, bass, percussion, strings & horns arranging 
 ILYA - keys, bass , percussion , drums , guitar  
 Michael Engstrom - bass 
 Mattias Johansson - violin 
 David Bukovinszky - cello 
 Mattias Bylund - string synthesizer, strings & horns arranging, strings & horns recording & editing , synthesizer horns , horns recording & editing 
 Magnus Johansson - trumpet 
 Janne Bjerger - trumpet 
 Wojtek Goral - alto sax , tenor sax, baritone sax 
 Tomas Jonsson - tenor sax , baritone sax 
 Peter Noos Johansson - trombone 
 Bizzy - guitar, bass 
 Max Martin - keys, bass , percussion , drums , guitar 
 DannyBoyStyles - keys, bass, percussion 
 Matthew Humphrey - keys, drums 
 Frank Sanders - keys, drums 
 The Horn Guys - horns arranging 
 Elof Loelv - keys, bass, drums, synthesizer, guitar 
 Andrés Torres - guitar 
 Jordan "DJ Swivel" Young - additional drum programming 
 Jonathan Perkins - keys, bass 
 Black Caviar – keys, guitar, bass, percussion

Production

 ILYA - production , vocal production 
 Rami Yacoub - production 
 Savan Kotecha - co-production , Chaka Khan vocals production 
 Aaron Joseph - Kim Petras vocals production 
 Max Martin - production , vocal production 
 Kuk Harrell - Normani vocals production 
 M-22 - production 
 Giorgio Moroder - production 
 Pete Bellotte - production 
 Gigamesh - remix production 
 Peter Karlsson - Chaka Khan vocals production 
 Elof Loelv - production 
 Andrés Torres - co-production 
 Mauricio Rengifo - co-production 
 Jonathan Perkins - production 
 Tommy Brown - production 
 Mr. Franks - production 
 Travis Sayles - production 
 Jack Elliott - production 
 Allyn Ferguson - production

Technical

 Serban Ghenea – mixing 
 Sam Holland – engineering 
 Cory Bice – engineering 
 Jeremy Lertola – engineering 
 Parker Ament – Kash Doll vocals engineering 
 Aaron Joseph – Kim Petras vocals engineering 
 Rymez – Stefflon Don vocals engineering 
 Kalle Keskikuru – Alma vocals engineering 
 John Hanes – mix engineering 
 ILYA – programming , arrangement 
 Rami Yacoub – programming 
 Kuk Harrell – Normani vocals engineering 
 Simone Torres – Normani vocals engineering 
 Aubry "Big Juice" Delaine – Nicki Minaj vocals engineering 
 Max Martin - programming , arrangement 
 DannyBoyStyles - programming 
 Matthew Humphrey - mixing, programming 
 Frank Sanders - mixing, programming 
 Tim Horner – mix engineering 
 Todd Cooper – mix engineering 
 Jürgen Koppers – recording, mix engineer 
 Steven D. Smith – recording 
 Peter Karlsson - Chaka Khan vocals recording 
 Savan Kotecha - Chaka Khan vocals recording 
 Elof Loelv - programming 
 Jordan "DJ Swivel" Young - mixing 
 Harry Chapin - mix assistant 
 Jonathan Perkins - engineering, programming 
 Zaq Reynolds - additional engineering 
 Tommy Brown - recording, programming 
 Billy Hickey - recording 
 Mr. Franks - programming 
 Travis Sayles - programming 
 Black Caviar – mix engineering, programming

Artwork

 Ryan Rogers – art direction
 Jacob Lerman – package design

Charts

References

2019 soundtrack albums
Action film soundtracks
Albums produced by Max Martin
Albums produced by Ilya Salmanzadeh
Albums produced by Rami Yacoub
Charlie's Angels (franchise)
Comedy film soundtracks